The 1966 North Dakota Fighting Sioux football team, also known as the Nodaks, was an American football team that represented the University of North Dakota in the North Central Conference (NCC) during the 1966 NCAA College Division football season. In its ninth year under head coach Marvin C. Helling, the team compiled an 8–2 record (5–1 against NCC opponents), tied with North Dakota State for the NCC championship, defeated  in the Pecan Bowl, and outscored opponents by a total of 338 to 154. The team played its home games at Memorial Stadium in Grand Forks, North Dakota.

Schedule

References

North Dakota
North Dakota Fighting Hawks football seasons
North Central Conference football champion seasons
North Dakota Fighting Sioux football

External Links
1966 Pecan Bowl (North Dakota in white jerseys)